Arístides Nicolás Masi González (born 14 January 1977) is a former Paraguayan footballer who played for clubs in Paraguay, Portugal and Chile.

Honours

Player
Audax Italiano
 Primera División de Chile (1): Runner-up 2006 Clausura

Notes

External links
 
 

1977 births
Living people
Paraguayan footballers
Paraguayan expatriate footballers
Paraguay international footballers
Cerro Porteño players
Club Olimpia footballers
Club Sol de América footballers
Sportivo Luqueño players
Audax Italiano footballers
Expatriate footballers in Chile
Expatriate footballers in Portugal
Paraguayan expatriate sportspeople in Portugal
Association football forwards
Club Sportivo San Lorenzo footballers